The church of Saint Nicholas in Budești Josani ("Lower Budești") in the village of Budeşti in the region of Maramureș, Cosău valley in Romania is representative of the characteristic wooden churches of Maramureș with double eaves. It is one of eight wooden churches of Maramureș that UNESCO has listed as a World Heritage Site.

Construction 
The wooden church at Budești Josani was dated by an inscription on the portal from 1643. Unfortunately the inscription was lost during the enlargement of the entrance in 1923. The inscription was verified dendrochronologically and the log structure was firmly dated from the winter 1642–43, i.e. the moment the timbers were felled. This church appears to have been built by the same master carpenter who built the wooden churches at Slătioara (before 1639) and Sârbi Susani (1639).

References 
Alexandru Baboș: Tracing a Sacred Building Tradition, Norrköping 2004.

External links 
 Romanian Monasteries
 Bilder aus Budesti

Wooden churches of Maramureș
Religious buildings and structures completed in 1643
17th-century Eastern Orthodox church buildings
Romanian Orthodox churches in Romania
1643 establishments in Europe
Former Greek-Catholic churches in Romania
17th-century churches in Romania